Wilton Jackson (born 15 November 1935) is a Trinidad and Tobago sprinter. 

Wilton Jackson took part in the 4 x 440 yards relay at the 1958 British Empire and Commonwealth Games in Cardiff. Trinidad and Tobago did not qualify for the final.

Representing the British West Indies, Jackson took bronze in the 4×100 metres relay at the 1959 Pan American Games. At the 1962 Central American and Caribbean Games, Jackson took part in both relay events with the Trinidad and Tobago team, winning silver in both events.

He competed in the men's 100 metres at the 1964 Summer Olympics, finishing fifth in his heat with a time of 10.6 seconds. Jackson appeared at the 1967 Pan American Games, this time representing Trinidad and Tobago, where his team came fourth in the final of the 4 x 100 metres relay.

References

External links
 

1935 births
Living people
Athletes (track and field) at the 1964 Summer Olympics
Trinidad and Tobago male sprinters
Olympic athletes of Trinidad and Tobago
Pan American Games bronze medalists for the British West Indies
Pan American Games medalists in athletics (track and field)
Athletes (track and field) at the 1959 Pan American Games
Athletes (track and field) at the 1967 Pan American Games
Commonwealth Games competitors for Trinidad and Tobago
Athletes (track and field) at the 1958 British Empire and Commonwealth Games
Place of birth missing (living people)
Medalists at the 1959 Pan American Games
Central American and Caribbean Games medalists in athletics